Michael Davies (born December 10, 1986) is an American professional ice hockey player. He played with UK EIHL side Sheffield Steelers,  played for EHC Black Wings Linz of the Austrian Hockey League (EBEL), and most recently for the Kalamazoo Wings (ECHL).

Playing career
Prior to turning professional, Davies played for St. Louis Heartland Eagles of the USHL, the Springfield Jr. Blues of the NAHL where he won Rookie of the Year, and the Lincoln Stars of the USHL.  Davies attended the University of Wisconsin–Madison where he played four seasons of college hockey with the NCAA Division I Wisconsin Badgers men's ice hockey team. He played professionally in the American Hockey League with the Bridgeport Sound Tigers and the Chicago Wolves.

On May 23, 2014, after 205 games played in the AHL, Davies signed his first contract abroad, agreeing to a one-year deal with Düsseldorfer EG of the German DEL. In the 2014–15 season, Davies was limited to 23 games due to injury, however performed at an elite level to contribute with 29 points.

On June 15, 2015, Davies opted to continue in the DEL, signing a one-year contract with the Hamburg Freezers. After one year with the Freezers, he moved on to fellow DEL side Augsburger Panther, signing a one-year deal in April 2016.

In the 2018–19 season, Davies moved to the neighbouring Austrian Hockey League (EBEL) signing a one-year contract with EHC Black Wings Linz. He contributed with 30 points through 39 games before leaving the club at the conclusion of their quarterfinal playoff defeat.

In June 2019, Davies moved to the UK to sign for EIHL side Sheffield Steelers.

Career statistics

Awards and honors

References

External links

1986 births
Living people
Augsburger Panther players
Bridgeport Sound Tigers players
Chicago Wolves players
Düsseldorfer EG players
EHC Black Wings Linz players
Gwinnett Gladiators players
Hamburg Freezers players
Kalamazoo Wings (ECHL) players
Lincoln Stars players
People from Chesterfield, Missouri
St. Louis Heartland Eagles players
Sheffield Steelers players
Wisconsin Badgers men's ice hockey players
American men's ice hockey right wingers